Kunihiko is a masculine Japanese given name. Notable people with the name include:

, Japanese physician and physiologist
}, Japanese composer
, artist, anime director
, NEC founder
, author of Viva! Origami (1983)
 (加瀬邦彦, 1941–2015), composer, music producer
, composer, lyricist, singer, actor
, Japanese mathematician
 actor
, Japanese textile artist
, Japanese music producer
, Japanese Democratic Party politician
, Japanese basketball player
, actor
, composer, arranger
, Japanese diplomat
, Japanese ice hockey player
, arranger
, pool player
, trainer, former jockey
, Japanese football player
, character designer
, Japanese voice actor
, Japanese basketball player
, Japanese director

Japanese masculine given names